Vyacheslav Yevgenyevich Akshayev (born 6 April 1959) is a Belarusian professional football coach and a former player.

Career
Akshayev is one of the most successful Belarusian coaches of the 90s and 2000s. He has led Lokomotiv-96 Vitebsk to win Belarusian Cup in 1998. In 2001 he won another Cup with Belshina Bobruisk before leading them to Belarusian Premier League title in 2002.

Between 2011 and 2012 he worked as an assistant coach in Belarus national football team under Georgi Kondratiev.

References

External links 

1959 births
Living people
Soviet footballers
Belarusian footballers
Association football midfielders
FC Vitebsk players
FC Lokomotiv Vitebsk (defunct) players
Belarusian football managers
FC Vitebsk managers
FC Gomel managers
FC Belshina Bobruisk managers
FC Molodechno managers
FC Partizan Minsk managers
FC Naftan Novopolotsk managers
FC Neman Grodno managers
FC SKVICH Minsk managers
FC DSK Gomel managers
FC Orsha managers
Sportspeople from Vitebsk